Frederick Henry Eugen of Anhalt-Dessau (27 December 1705 in Dessau – 2 March 1781 in Dessau), was a German prince of the House of Ascania from the Anhalt-Dessau branch.

He was the fourth son of Leopold I, Prince of Anhalt-Dessau, by his morganatic wife Anna Louise Föhse.

Life
In 1717, at age 12, Eugen joined the Prussian army. From 1733 to 1739 he was Chief of the Corps of the Prussian Hussar's regiment No. 1 (regiment of Pferde). In 1743 he left the Prussian service and joined the Austrian army under the command of Prince Charles Alexander of Lorraine as a volunteer on the Rhine. In 1746 he joined the army of the Electorate of Saxony, where he became a Governor of Wittenberg and later Generalfeldmarschall.

He never married or had children and never took part in the government of Anhalt-Dessau.

Literature
 

Frederick Henry
1705 births
1781 deaths
Recipients of the Order of the White Eagle (Poland)
Royal reburials
Sons of monarchs
Military personnel from Saxony-Anhalt
People from Dessau-Roßlau